John Lewis Nelson (June 29, 1916 – August 25, 2001), also known as his stage name Prince Rogers, was an American jazz musician and songwriter. He was the father of musicians Prince and Tyka Nelson and a credited co-writer on some of his son's songs.

Personal life
Nelson was born in Webster Parish, Louisiana, one of five children born to Carrie (Jenkins) and Clarence Nelson. He traveled to Minneapolis to become a musician in 1948. Playing the piano, Nelson used "Prince Rogers" as a stage name and started a band called "The Prince Rogers Trio" with local musicians.

In 1956, he met Mattie Della Shaw (November 11, 1933 – February 15, 2002) at a show on the north side of Minneapolis. Shaw was a jazz musician who became the musical group's singer. She had one son, Alfred Frank Alonzo Jackson (July 6, 1953 – August 29, 2019). Nelson married Shaw on August 31, 1957, and the couple had two more children, Prince (1958–2016, a musician who was named after his father's stage name) and Tyka Nelson (born 1960, a singer). The couple formally separated in 1965 and were divorced on September 24, 1968.

John Nelson's grandfather, Rev. Edward "Ed." Nelson was born to a White slaveowner, John Nelson and his Cherokee concubine. Rev. Ed became a travelling preacher for the Colored Methodist Episcopal Church and married Emma, a Black woman.

Death
Nelson died on August 25, 2001, aged 85, in his home in Chanhassen, Minnesota. That year Prince dedicated Joni Mitchell’s song "A Case of U", on his One Nite Alone... album, to his father.

Collaboration with Prince
John L. Nelson wrote (or co-wrote) some music which was released by Prince in the 1980s.

ASCAP credits
ASCAP credits, or co-credits, him with the following:
 "Father’s Song" and "Purple Rain Cues", from the film Purple Rain, 1984
 "Computer Blue" from the Purple Rain album and film, 1984
 "Around the World in a Day" (composed with David Coleman and Prince), "Paisley Park" (composed with David Coleman and Prince), and "The Ladder" (composed with Prince), from the album Around the World in a Day, 1985
 "Christopher Tracy’s Parade" (composed with Prince) and "Under the Cherry Moon" (composed with Prince) from the album Parade, 1986
 "Under the Cherry Moon Cues" from the film Under the Cherry Moon, 1986
 "Scandalous!" from the Batman album and film, 1989

References

1916 births
2001 deaths
African-American jazz composers
African-American jazz pianists
African-American songwriters
Songwriters from Louisiana
American jazz composers
American male jazz composers
American jazz pianists
American male pianists
People from Chanhassen, Minnesota
Jazz musicians from Louisiana
Jazz musicians from Minnesota
20th-century jazz composers
20th-century American male musicians
20th-century African-American musicians
American male songwriters